HMS Manxman (M70) was an of the Royal Navy. The ship is named for an inhabitant of the Isle of Man. It served in the Mediterranean during World War II, and entered the Reserve Fleet following the end of the war.

Second World War

Commissioned on 7 June 1941, her first mission was the delivery of mines to Murmansk. Manxman then transferred to the Mediterranean, where she was employed on relief runs to Malta. In August she took part in Operation Mincemeat, which involved mine-laying in the Gulf of Genoa while disguised as the French destroyer Léopard.  From October 1941 to February 1942, Manxman was returned to the Home Fleet and took part in a number of mine-laying operations in the North Sea and the English Channel. In March, she joined the Eastern Fleet at Kilindini in the Indian Ocean. After escort and patrol duties, on 8 October she participated in the assault and capture of the island of Nosy Be on the north west coast of Madagascar, which was occupied by Vichy French forces.

Transferring to the Mediterranean again, Manxman was sent with supplies to Malta, followed by mine-laying in the Sicilian Channel. Following emergency repairs at Oran and Gibraltar, she returned to Newcastle-upon-Tyne for extensive repair work.

Manxman was re-commissioned on 10 April 1945 and made ready to join the British Pacific Fleet. However, the ship did not reach Colombo until 14 July, and was in Melbourne, Australia, on Victory over Japan Day.

Post-war

The ship remained in Australia until June 1946, then underwent repairs at Chatham back in England before returning to the far East from February to December of 1947. Following a refit, Manxman joined the Mediterranean Fleet in 1951. In 1953, she appeared in the film Sailor of the King as the German cruiser Essen. She was fitted for the film with enlarged funnels and mock-up triple-gun turrets over her 4-inch guns. The "torpedo damage" which forces her delay at "Resolution Island" was painted on the side of her port bow. The scenes when she is holed up for repairs were filmed in the semi-circular Dwejra bay, guarded by Fungus Rock on the west coast of Gozo Island in Malta. In 1953 she also took part in the Fleet Review to celebrate the Coronation of Queen Elizabeth II.

In 1956, Manxman was deployed for headquarters duties during the Suez operation. She is said to have outrun an American Carrier Group during the Suez Crisis of 1956. Manxman reportedly shadowed them; the US Admiral increased speed, eventually to over thirty knots – and then Manxman swept past at full speed, showing the signal "See you in Egypt". It is far from clear whether this episode happened; 'knowledge' about it was common in the Merchant Navy of the 1970s. This story was often told in the Royal Navy (not the Merchant Navy which is not technically an organisation), long before 1956; it was supposed to have happened in the Pacific at the end of World War II.

In reserve at Malta and refitting

She was refitted in Chatham in the early 60s and converted to a minesweeper support vessel. When the forward boiler was removed and the compartment was fitted with diesel generators to supply outboard power to minesweepers, she was fitted with a dummy forward funnel, which housed the diesel exhausts and ventilation for the compartment. Much of the mine stowage was removed to make way for additional accommodation. Commissioning in 1963, she was subsequently stationed in Singapore.

Returning to the UK in 1968, Manxman was used for engineering training at Devonport and following a fire, was transferred to the reserve at Chatham Dockyard until broken up at Newport in 1973.

Footnotes

Bibliography
 
 
 

 

Abdiel-class minelayers
Ships built on the River Clyde
1940 ships
World War II minelayers of the United Kingdom
Mine warfare vessels of the Royal Navy